Loo is a small borough in Jõelähtme Parish, Harju County in northern Estonia. At the 2011 Census, the settlement's population was 2,093.

References

Boroughs and small boroughs in Estonia